Xiao Junlong (born 3 November 2000), is a Chinese footballer who plays as a right-back for Mirassol.

Club career
Born in Tianjin, Xiao started his career with Beijing Guoan. He had a brief spell with Shandong Luneng Taishan in 2014 and 2015, spending time with their overseas football camp in Brazil. He trained with Brazilian side Ituano, before the expiration of his contract with Beijing Guoan in 2018, at which time he joined Ituano permanently.

The following year, he trained with Santos, who were unable to offer him an official contract at the time, due to the nature of his visa. On 24 August 2021, having overcome an ankle injury, he signed a three-year contract with Santos.

Despite Xiao's release clause being a reported €100 million, he was released by Santos just a year into his contract. Shortly after his departure from Santos, he joined Fortaleza.

After failing to make an appearance at any level for Fortaleza, he joined Série B side Mirassol ahead of the 2023 season.

Career statistics

Club

Notes

References

2000 births
Living people
Footballers from Tianjin
Chinese footballers
Association football fullbacks
Beijing Guoan F.C. players
Shandong Taishan F.C. players
Ituano FC players
Santos FC players
Fortaleza Esporte Clube players
Mirassol Futebol Clube players
Chinese expatriate footballers
Chinese expatriate sportspeople in Brazil
Expatriate footballers in Brazil